Jesús Zaid Veyna Montes (born March 17, 1995, in Zacatecas City, Zacatecas), is a Mexican professional footballer who plays for Gavilanes de Matamoros in the Mexican first division. He formerly played for Liga MX club Atlético San Luis and Liga MX side Club América.

External links
 

Living people
1995 births
C.D. Tepatitlán de Morelos players
Atlético San Luis footballers
Club Necaxa footballers
Liga MX players
Ascenso MX players
Liga Premier de México players
People from Zacatecas City
Footballers from Zacatecas
Association football defenders
Mexican footballers